Erik Severson (born February 3, 1974) is a Wisconsin politician and legislator.

Born in Duluth, Minnesota, Severson graduated with a BS from the University of Minnesota Duluth, and obtained an MD from the Mayo Medical School. He worked as an emergency room physician before he was elected in 2010. Severson was elected to the Wisconsin State Assembly in 2010. He represented District 28 as a Republican from 2010 to 2015.

Notes

University of Minnesota Duluth alumni
Physicians from Wisconsin
Republican Party members of the Wisconsin State Assembly
1974 births
Living people
21st-century American politicians
People from Osceola, Wisconsin